Gisela Otto (born 23 February 1951) is a German luger. She competed in the women's singles event at the 1972 Winter Olympics.

References

External links
 

1951 births
Living people
German female lugers
Olympic lugers of West Germany
Lugers at the 1972 Winter Olympics
Sportspeople from Bayreuth